The Legend of Dragoon is a role-playing video game developed by Japan Studio and published by Sony Computer Entertainment for the PlayStation in 1999 in Japan, 2000 in North America, and 2001 in Europe. Set in a high fantasy fictional world called Endiness, the game follows a group of warriors led by the protagonist, Dart, as they attempt to stop the destruction of the world. The player controls a party of 3D character models through pre-rendered, linear environments. Combat uses a combination of turn-based mechanics and real-time commands. Notably, the game includes a quick time event called "addition" during each attack, requiring the player to press a button when two squares converge.

Development began in 1996 and took three years with a production team of over one hundred, and cost $16 million, notably high for the time. The game's use of realistic CGI cutscenes drew attention from the press. On release, The Legend of Dragoon received mixed reviews, with critics comparing it unfavourably to the Final Fantasy series. The Legend of Dragoon sold more than one million copies worldwide, with most of those sales coming from North America. An album of the game's soundtrack was released in 2000, as well as a novel and manga inspired by the game.

Gameplay

The Legend of Dragoon features three modes of play: the area map, the field, and the battle screen. Players explore the world of The Legend of Dragoon by following predetermined routes on a linear 3D map. At the end of each route are various representations of areas for the player to enter, including towns and dungeons. As the game progresses more routes are revealed for the player to traverse. In the field map, the player navigates fully scaled versions of the areas represented on the world map, which are superimposed on pre-rendered backgrounds. The player can explore the environment, talk with characters and advance the story.

At random intervals on the area map and in field mode, and at specific moments in the story, the game will enter the battle screen. A maximum of three characters are used in each battle. On a party member’s turn, the player chooses a command for their character to take such as attacking with a weapon, guarding to recover health, using items, or running away. When the "attack" option is selected a quick-time event mechanic is activated called “addition”. Two blue squares appear on the screen and start to converge. If the player presses a button when the squares overlap the character will continue the addition and do more damage. Characters will receive multiple additions over the course of the game, which have longer chains and deal more damage. The longer additions, however, allow enemies the opportunity to counter and the player needs to press a different button to continue their attack. A player can also select a magic attack item where the player can increase the strength of the attack by repeatedly pressing a button.

During the game's story, a character will obtain a Dragoon Spirit which gives them the ability to transform into "Dragoon form" while in combat. Dragoon form changes the character's appearance, giving them wings and making them float in the air. The character can only become a Dragoon during a battle if they have obtained spirit points, which are received after successfully executing an addition attack. In Dragoon form, the character receives a boost to their damage and damage resistance, and their commands of attack, guard, items, and run are replaced with Dragoon Attack and Dragoon Magic. If Dragoon Attack is selected, the player enters a new quick time event to extend the number of attacks they execute. A circle appears with a line that moves clockwise and when the line reaches the top of the circle, the player must press X to execute an additional attack. Dragoon Magic allows the player to execute a powerful offensive or defensive spell. The Dragoon form is only usable for a limited number of turns and must recharge to be used again.

When not in battle, the player can use the menu screen. This screen is used to review each character's status and statistics, use items and abilities, save the game (when on the world map or at a save point), and select an addition attack for use in battle.

Plot

Setting and characters

The Legend of Dragoon takes place on a world referred to in-game as "Endiness". Its aesthetic resembles the Middle Ages with fantasy elements such as swords, magic and dragons. The world contains a variety of species including Humans, Dragons and Winglies. Humans live as farmers while Dragons look like winged creatures and possess Dragon Spirits. Winglies are an aggressive species who are able to fly and enslaved humans 10,000 years before the start of the game. Humans became Dragoons by obtaining the help of Dragons to defeat the Winglies and, at the time of the game's events, live in relative peace.

There are nine playable protagonists in the game. The main protagonist is Dart, a warrior who is searching for the Black Monster. Shana is Dart's childhood friend and love interest. Rose is a warrior who teaches Dart how to fight as a Dragoon. Albert is the king of Basil, a duchy within the game and Lavitz is his loyal knight who fights with a spear. Meru is a dancer from a flower town and Kongol is the last of his species alive in the game's world. Haschel is an elderly man searching for his daughter and Miranda is a magician.

Story
Dart is travelling to his hometown when he is attacked by a dragon. He is saved by Rose, who informs Dart that the Sandora army has attacked the town. As he arrives he discovers that the town has been destroyed and his childhood friend Shana has been taken to a prison.

After rescuing Shana with the help of Lavitz, King Albert sends the party to defend the fort-city of Hoax. During a surprise attack, Dart gains the ability to transform into a Dragoon. With the fort safe, the party travels to Lohan where they meet Lloyd and discover that he kidnapped King Albert and took the Moon Gem from him, an ancient artifact held by the Royal Family. The king is rescued, but Lloyd escapes with the Moon Gem, killing Lavitz in the process. The party discovers that Lloyd is gathering similar artifacts held by royalty across the continent and while the party tries to reverse his work, Lloyd obtains all three of the artifacts. Dart and the party defeat Lloyd, who agrees to take them to Emperor Diaz.

Diaz reveals that during the Wingly reign 10,000 years ago a creature called the Virage Embryo, also known as the God of Destruction, came to the world to end all other life. Before it could be born, the Winglies used their magic to separate its body from its soul and cast the body into the sky, where it became the Moon That Never Sets. They sealed the moon with magical Signets placed in each of the Wingly cities to prevent the soul and body from reuniting. The soul of the God of Destruction was originally placed inside the Crystal Sphere, which was worn by the Wingly ruler Melbu Frahma to increase his power. The Crystal Sphere was shattered when Dragoons attacked the Wingly capital of Kadessa.

The soul of the God of Destruction has wandered the Earth and every one hundred and eight years possesses the body of a human child in an attempt to return to its body. The body can be summoned if the Signets are destroyed, which is done using the immense magical power contained within the artifacts that Lloyd gathered. In the present day, the human that is the soul of the God of Destruction is Shana. Emperor Diaz reveals himself to be Zieg Feld, Dart's father and leader of the Dragoons 10,000 years ago. Melbu Frahma cast a spell that both petrified Zieg and kept his own spirit alive within Zieg's body.

Zieg – possessed by Melbu Frahma – takes Shana and destroys the remaining Signet Spheres that seal the Moon That Never Sets, causing it to fall from the sky. He carries Shana to the body of the God of Destruction so that the body will sense the presence of its soul and prepare to restore itself. Instead, Melbu Frahma unites with the body himself, taking the form and power of the God of Destruction. Zieg is released from Melbu Frahma's possession and the party is able to defeat Melbu. Zieg and Rose sacrifice themselves to destroy Melbu Frahma and the surviving party members return to various points on the continent and live separate lives.

Development
The Legend of Dragoon was developed in-house by Sony Computer Entertainment, Inc. The game was directed and designed by Yasuyuki Hasebe, who also created the story outline. The producer was Shuhei Yoshida, and this game was both one of the last and largest projects he worked on prior to leaving Japan Studio. Kenichi Iwata was the game's art director and designer of the Dragoon armor, working on character designs alongside Tatsuya Nakamura. The game's monsters were designed by Itsuo Itoh, and the dragons were created by Hirohiko Iyoku. The script was written and supervised by Takehiro Kaminagayoshi. Sony's internal studio Polyphony Digital assisted in creating the game's CGI cutscenes.

Production of the game lasted three years. At the beginning of its development in 1996 the company was also creating Ape Escape and Ico, so The Legend of Dragoon began with a very small team. The production team  grew to over 100 staff members and had a budget of $16 million, both considered very large for a PlayStation game. The "Addition" battle system was designed to make players feel like they were actively participating in a battle rather than selecting commands and waiting for actions to finish. The team's strive for realism resulted in magic — a common character ability in RPGs — only being incorporated into the Dragoon state or through items with equivalent effects.

There were originally no plans for CGI movies as the character models were polygon-based and there would be a disconnect between real-time and CGI graphics. The development team acquiesced to use CGI movies for key events because they looked impressive and they wanted to showcase the characters flying through the air. It was challenging for the developers to create smoke because it was their first time attempting this effect. The game's real-time lighting was designed to emulate the lighting used in CGI cutscenes so the development team focused on the parts that the player would be drawn to, allowing its economical use. The number of CGI movies and pre-rendered backgrounds meant that the game had to be spread across four CDs, which was the maximum number of discs possible for a single PlayStation case.

According to Yoshida, a dedicated team of ten artists worked on the game's concept art. The team chose the character's names by writing down 100 names between the letters A to N and then choosing the names they liked best and attaching them to the characters who fit the proposed name. Iwata was chosen to design the main characters after other designers proposed an anime aesthetic, which was rejected. Iwata originally only designed Dart and Rose, with Rose's hair being bright green. As the setting shifted towards a more realistic tone, elements such as Rose's green hair were removed. The characters were given key colors so players could easily distinguish them from each other, with each color matching a character's personality.

Music
The music of The Legend of Dragoon was co-composed by Dennis Martin and Takeo Miratsu. Martin was an American-born composer with a resume including Japanese television series Rasen for TV Asahi, while Miratsu had worked on the music of Jumping Flash! and its sequel in addition to forming one half of the duo Twin Amadeus. Martin was both the soundtrack programmer and pianist. The soundtrack featured contributions from guitarist Chuei Yoshikawa, bass work by New York musicians Jonathan Maron (Groove Collective), percussion from Ray Grappone (Hipbone Records), and saxophone by Jay Rodriguez (also of Groove Collective). The synthesizer operator was Tetsuo Yamazaki. The music recording sessions were split between the Tokyo-based SEDIC and the Sound On Sound studio in New York. Mixing was also done at Sound On Sound. The Legend of Dragoon was Martin's first work for a video game, and was chosen because Sony wanted a different musical style to other RPGs at the time. Martin was originally supposed to compose the game's music himself, but the game's 4 CD-length made this impractical and the Japanese staff hired Miratsu to create additional soundtracks. Martin and Miratsu did not meet each other while working on the game although Martin stated that having a native Japanese composer with a different style to his broadened the soundtrack's variety.

Martin had trouble creating music during the early stages of development and credited the patience of the main production team as instrumental in finding a suitable style and pace for the music. When creating the soundtrack, he needed to fulfill requests from the production team on the soundtrack's overall style and individual pieces but was given creative licence within these parameters. His early work focused on what Martin described as a "percussive/ethnic approach", but the team wanted stronger melodies. Martin was afraid such melodies would get tiresome because the music would loop several times during gameplay, so he added groove elements to negate the issue as he felt groove "[could] loop forever". Martin used the game's artwork and storyboards for inspiration when creating the tracks. One of the two demo discs Martin submitted became the music for the opening CGI cutscene. Martin found the limited PlayStation hardware frustrating for compositions. The game's main theme, "If You Still Believe", was performed by Elsa Raven. The song was composed, written and produced and Martin. The recording of the theme song was split between Tokyo and New York.

Release 
The Legend of Dragoon was announced in September 1999 after cutscenes from the game were shown at that year's SIGGRAPH event. It was among the games displayed at the 1999 Tokyo Game Show. The game released in Japan on December 2, 1999.

A North American release was confirmed by Sony in January 2000 and released on June 14, 2000. Yoshida supervised the North American release following his move to Sony's North American branch. The gameplay was adjusted to become less difficult after feedback from Japanese players, with Yoshida calling the North American release the "complete" version. The game was released in Europe on January 19, 2001. The game was re-released as a PlayStation Classic through PlayStation Network on December 22, 2010 in Japan and May 1, 2012 in North America. In a retrospective article about the series, Yoshida stated that a sequel was in pre-production after Yoshida left Japan, but was cancelled for unknown reasons.

In February 2023, Sony Interactive Entertainment announced via the PlayStation Blog that The Legend of Dragoon will be digitally available on PlayStation 4 and PlayStation 5 on February 21, 2023 under the Classics Catalogue. This version will be released with enhanced features such as up-rendering, rewind, quick save, and custom video filters.

Reception

The Legend of Dragoon was given a score of 74 out of 100 by review aggregation website Metacritic based on 12 reviews, indicating a "mixed or average" reception. The game was nominated at the 2001 D.I.C.E. Awards in the "Console Role-Playing Game" category.

The game was praised by David Smith in his review for IGN for its cinematics and graphics, which are cited as major drawing points for the game. The addition quick-time events were criticised for requiring too much precision, and the titular element of Dragoon transformation was deemed inconsequential to the gameplay. He also criticised the excessive frequency of random encounters. Eric Bratcher reviewed the game for Next Generation and stated it was "a vast, majestic game that emulates the weaknesses of FFVIII as well as the strengths. Still, it's a fantastic title with an incredibly compelling concept." Jeuxvideo.com said the gameplay did not surpass the Final Fantasy series while Gamekult said it presented some interesting concepts but "does not have the magic of Final Fantasy IX." Ken Chu, in reviewing the Japanese version, said that it would be considered a good game if it was evaluated on its own merits, instead of in comparison to other video game titles.

GameSpot's Peter Bartholow was more critical of the game, calling it a "highly generic RPG" that "borrows too heavily from other games and lacks that 'hook' to make it worth dealing with excessive defending." Citan Uzuki from RPGFan declared it was an "average RPG." When reviewing its re-release in 2012, Neal Chandran noted that "The Legend of Dragoon is one of the most underrated RPGs in the PlayStation era" and that it was enjoyable once the reviewer was comfortable with its gameplay mechanics and changes from traditional RPG characteristics.

Sales
Upon its debut in Japan, The Legend of Dragoon reached second place in sales behind Pokémon Gold and Silver, selling over 160,000 units and becoming the best-selling new release that week. By the end of 1999, the game had sold over 280,000 copies in Japan. According to Yoshida, sales in the United States were stronger than those in Japan, allowing the game to recoup its large budget. By 2007, The Legend of Dragoon had sold 960,000 copies in the United States and 355,240 copies in Japan, for a total of  units sold in these regions.

The game's PSN release topped the PlayStation Classics sales charts and remained in the top five for the next three months.

Other media

An original soundtrack album for the game was released in Japan on January 21, 2000, by SPE Visual Works. RPGFan's Lucy Rzeminski called the album "a passable CD if you give it a chance to sink in", praising some tracks but finding most of the album lacking in both quality and variety. Chris Greening of Square Enix Music Online gave the album a score of 6/10, saying that while innovative at the time, had been superseded in quality by later soundtracks. He recommended that fans buy the soundtrack despite the album missing several tracks from the game. Both critics praised the main theme of "If You Still Believe" as a high-quality theme song. "If You Still Believe" was included in the compilation album Game Music Collection ～Sony Computer Entertainment Japan Best～, published by King Records on January 23, 2005.

The series was twice adapted following its Japanese release; a novelization written by Hiranari Izuno and published by Famitsu Bunko in March 2000, and a short-lived manga created by Ataru Cagiva published in a tankōbon by Enterbrain in June the same year. Dart was also intended to be a downloadable content character for PlayStation All-Stars Battle Royale.

Notes

References

External links

 

1999 video games
Video games about dragons
Fantasy video games
PlayStation (console) games
PlayStation Network games
Role-playing video games
Sony Interactive Entertainment games
Video games about magic
Video games developed in Japan
Video games featuring female protagonists
Video games scored by Takeo Miratsu
Single-player video games